Treat Me Right is the first album released by Florida bluesman Eric Sardinas. It is noted for its use of traditional recording techniques with each song being recorded in one take without any kind of digital editing, which follows Sardinas's motto "respect tradition" which he had tattooed on his back.

Track listing
"Treat Me Right"
"Write Me a Few Lines"
"Murdering Blues"
"Cherry Bomb"
"My Baby's Got Something"
"Give Me Love"
"Rollin' and Tumblin'"
"Low Down Love"
"Get Along Rider"
"Goin' to the River"
"I Can't Be Satisfied"
"Sweetwater Blues"
"Down in the Bottom"
"Tired of Tryin'"

References

1999 debut albums
Eric Sardinas albums
Evidence Music albums